The Dragon, The Hero is a Hong Kong martial art movie directed by Godfrey Ho and starring Philip Ko, Dragon Lee, Tino Wong Cheung and Liu Chung-Liang. The movie is considered as one of the best martial arts movie that Godfrey Ho directed outside of the martial arts movie fanbase . The movie is also known as Dragon on Fire.

Plot
Tu Wu Shen and Tang are direct descendants of Strike Rock Fist master who began as best friends however ended up being worst enemies. The revenge continues throughout their lives until the two warriors discover that they have a common enemy, Ma Ti, a perverse master of dangerous Su Ta. Tu Wu Shen and Tang must forget about the past and reunite to fight against the evil menace.

Cast

John Liu as Tu Wu Shen
Tino Wong Cheung as Tang
Philip Ko as Ma Ti
Dragon Lee as Ah Tien
Chiang Kam as Fat dish washer
David Wu as Thin Dish Washer
Alexander as Gwailo at market 
Chan Lau as old groper
Bolo Yeung as King Kong (Cameo)
Mars as thug (uncredited)
Wong Chi Ming extra, action director
Lee Ting Ying
Lee Hang

Alternate title confusion
While originally the film was released as under the name of The Dragon, the Hero, some of the media release has the name confusion as The Dragon on Fire, which was an alternate of Enter Three Dragons (Another Dragon Lee movie that was co-directed by Godfrey Ho previously in 1978.).

Media release
The movie was released on DVD by the company Hong Kong Connection and released on VHS under the name Muscle of the Dragon and also Dragon on Fire. The movie was also released on the remastered German DVD with original Mandarin dubbed version.

External links

Hong Kong martial arts films
1979 films
1979 martial arts films
1970s martial arts films
Bruceploitation films
1970s Hong Kong films